Mário Lúcio da Silva Junior (Born 11 December 1989 in Dourados, Mato Grosso do Sul, Brazil), simply Mário Lúcio, is a Brazilian professional football player who currently plays for Croatian First Football League side NK Istra 1961.

Mário Lúcio was signed by China League One side Tianjin Songjiang in July 2013.

References

External links
 

1989 births
Living people
Brazilian footballers
Association football midfielders
Guarani FC players
Santa Cruz Futebol Clube players
Red Bull Brasil players
Mogi Mirim Esporte Clube players
Tianjin Tianhai F.C. players
China League One players
NK Istra 1961 players
Croatian Football League players
Brazilian expatriate footballers
Expatriate footballers in China
Brazilian expatriate sportspeople in China
People from Dourados
Sportspeople from Mato Grosso do Sul